Samuel Butler may refer to:

Samuel Butler (poet) (1613–1680), English poet and satirist
Samuel Butler (schoolmaster) (1774–1839), English classical scholar
Samuel Butler (politician) (1825–1891), American politician
Samuel Butler (novelist) (1835–1902), English author of Erewhon
Samuel Butler (cricketer) (1850–1903), English cricketer  
Sam Butler (born 1986), Australian rules footballer
Sam Butler (footballer, born 2003), Australian rules footballer
Bo Weavil Jackson (fl. 1926), blues singer and guitarist also known as Sam Butler